Dia Toutinji (born May 3, 1960) is a Syrian Olympic athlete. She represented Syria in 1980 Summer Olympics in Moscow.

Olympic Participation

Moscow 1980
Toutinji and Hala El-Moughrabi were the only female participants for Syria in that tournament among a total of 67 participant for Syria.

Athletics – Women's high jump

References

1960 births
Living people
Athletes (track and field) at the 1980 Summer Olympics
Syrian female high jumpers
Olympic athletes of Syria
20th-century Syrian women